Anna Amalia Bergendahl (1827–1899) was a Dutch author, publisher, philanthropist and abolitionist. She played a significant part in the Dutch Abolitionist movement, known for her public campaign and funding for the issue at the time of the abolition of slavery in the Dutch colonial empire.

In 1856, she founded the abolitionist society 'Dames-Comité ter Bevordering van de Evangelieverkondiging en de Afschaffing der Slavernij', an association for women with the purpose of the abolition of the slavery in Dutch Surinam.

References 

Dutch abolitionists
19th-century Dutch businesspeople
19th-century Dutch writers
Dutch philanthropists
Dutch publishers (people)
19th-century publishers (people)
1827 births
1899 deaths
19th-century philanthropists